The name A2 Ethniki may refer to one of below Greek leagues:
A2 Ethniki, the 2nd-tier Greek basketball League
A2 Ethniki Volleyball, the 2nd-tier Greek volleyball League
A2 Ethniki Water Polo, the 2nd-tier Greek water polo League
A2 Ethniki Handball, the 2nd-tier Greek handball League
A2 Ethniki Women's Basketball, the 2nd-tier Greek women's basketball League
A2 Ethniki Women's Volleyball, the 2nd-tier Greek women's volleyball League